Kakarla Tyagabrahmam, colloquially known as Tyāgarāja and Tyagayya, was one of the greatest composers of Carnatic music or Indian classical music. He was a prolific composer and highly influential in the development of the South Indian classical music tradition. Tyagaraja composed thousands of devotional compositions, most of them in praise of Lord Rama; most of which remain very popular even today. Of special mention are five of his compositions called the Pancharatna Kriti (English: 'five gems'),  which are often sung in programmes in his honor.

Ghana Raga Pancharatnam

Thiruvottriyur Pancharatnam
These kritis are composed on the Goddess Tripurasundari of the Thyagaraja Temple at Thiruvottriyur. It is said that Thyagaraja composed these at the request of his disciple Veena Kuppayyar.

Kovur Pancharatnam
The following kritis are composed on the presiding deity of the Sundareswarar Temple at Kovur.

Shriranga Pancharatnam

Lalgudi Pancharatnam
Thyagaraja composed the following krithis on the deities Saptarishishwarar and his consort Pravrddha Shrimati at their temple in Lalgudi (previously known as Thiruthavathurai).

Panchanadheeswara Thiruvaiyaru  Kritis

Pancha Nadīśvara Kritis

Dharmasamvardhani Devi Kritis

Kritis composed at Kanchipuram

Varadaraja Perumal Kritis

Kanchi Kamakshi Kriti

Tirupati Venkateshwara Kritis

Neelayatakshi Kritis
The following kritis are addressed to Goddess Neelayatakshi of Kayarohanaswami Temple at Nagapattinam.

Divya Nāma Sankīrtana

Utsava Sampradāya Kritis

Musical Dramas

Prahlada Bhakti Vijayam

Nouka Charitram

Other Kritis

Other Compositions that contain the Thyagaraja mudra

See also
 List of compositions by Muthuswami Dikshitar

External links 
 Complete text of compositions in Telugu
 Lyrics of Tyagaraja Kritis

References 

Carnatic composers
India music-related lists